The 2015 Bhutan National League was the fourth season of national football competition in Bhutan, having replaced the A-Division (Bhutan) in 2013. Again, the A-Division provided the qualifiers, with the top three teams in that competition being awarded places in the National League alongside three regional teams. The league was sponsored by the Bank of Bhutan.

Terton were crowned champions of the national league after beating Thimphu City, who were then the top team in the league, in their final game 4–2 on 23 September.

Thimphu League
The 2015 season of the Thimphu League, called the Yanmar Thimphu League for sponsorship reasons, and previously the Bhutan A-Division, started on April 4, 2015 and ended on May 13. Terton won the competition in their inaugural season, and were joined in the National League by Thimphu FC and Thimphu City.

Format and rules
The Thimphu League is a regional competition for teams from Thimphu. the competition consists of seven teams, each plays the others twice – home and away – for a total of 12 games each, over 14 game weeks. 3 points are awarded for a win, 1 point for a draw and 0 points for a loss. the league table is decided firstly on points won, then on goal difference and finally on total goals scored if the previous two are equal. The first three teams automatically qualify for the National league, the bottom two teams compete in relegation playoffs with the top two teams from the B-Division for two places in the next seasons's competition.

League table

Results

National League

Format and rules
The competition consists of six teams competing for the national league championship, the winner of which gains a place in the next season's. AFC Cup. Each plays the others twice – home and away – for a total of 10 games each, over 10 game weeks. 3 points are awarded for a win, 1 point for a draw and 0 points for a loss. the league table is decided firstly on points won, then on goal difference and finally on total goals scored if the previous two are equal. There is no promotion or relegation from this league.

Teams

A total of six teams competed in the league: three teams representing Thimphu, who qualified as a result of their final positions in the 2015 A-Division, and three teams representing other districts.
 Bhutan Clearing (representing Chukha District)
 Paro United (representing Paro District)
 Terton (winners of the 2015 A-Division)
 Thimphu (runners-up in the 2015 A-Division)
 Thimphu City (third place in the 2015 A-Division)
 Ugyen Academy (representing Punakha District)

League table

Results

References

Bhutan National League seasons
Bhutan
1